Clown in a Cornfield is a 2020 horror novel by American author Adam Cesare and marks his first novel in the young adult genre.

Film rights for the novel have been optioned by Temple Hill Entertainment.

Synopsis
The novel centers upon Quinn Maybrook, a teenage girl who is a senior in high school, has recently moved to the small factory town of Kettle Springs, Missouri from Philadelphia after the tragic death of her mother, Samantha. Her father, Glenn, has been hired as the new town physician in the hopes that this will allow the two of them to heal.  

Kettle Springs has suffered financially since the closing of the Baypen Corn Syrup Factory and its subsequent burning due to arson by a local boy named Cole Hill. As a result, the town is at odds with itself and strict lines are drawn between the largely conservative adults and the teens, who are more interested in having fun and getting views on their YouTube channel. 

Quinn manages to befriend Cole and his group of friends, including Queen Bee Janet, the ponytail-wearing Ronnie, and her boyfriend Matt, after an incident during her first day in class. Their science teacher, Mr. Vern, sends them all to study hall, and they get to talking about their group and the town's eerie history. 

During the study hall, Quinn is invited to attend the town's annual Founder's Day celebration, despite Mr. Vern banning them from the event. She is also invited to the subsequent party planned by Janet that's taking place in the nearby cornfield. 

However, things take a turn for the worst when the town's mascot, Frendo the Clown, begins to kill the town's "wayward" youth one by one.

Development 
When writing the novel Cesare wanted to "do not so much a throwback slasher as an attempt at a modern slasher with modern themes."

Release 
Clown in a Cornfield was released in the United States in hardback and ebook format on August 25, 2020 through HarperTeen. An audiobook adaptation narrated by Jesse Vilinsky was released on the same day through HarperCollins.

Reception
Clown in a Cornfield has been reviewed by outlets such as Locus Magazine and the Library Journal, the latter of which stated that "While this title is marketed to teens, adult readers familiar with the classic horror slasher movies of the 1980s and 1990s should find it appeals." Signal Horizon and Bad Feeling Magazine also reviewed the novel, both praising Cesare for his writing.

Sequel 
In 2021 Cesare announced that he had been working on a sequel to Clown in a Cornfield and that it would be released the following year on August 23, 2022. The book, entitled Clown in a Cornfield 2: Frendo Lives, sees Quinn attempting to move on with her life after the events of the first book. She is forced to endure deranged conspiracy theories about the massacre, the most major of which claims that it never happened in the first place. When she is attacked by someone in a clown costume at a party, Quinn must return home in order to face the past and discover what exactly is going on. An audiobook adaptation voiced by Jesse Vilinsky will be published alongside print and eBook releases.

References

2020s horror novels
Young adult novels
Novels about clowns
Novels set in Missouri
American horror novels
American young adult novels
Novels about mass murder